Grupa Lotos S.A. was a vertically integrated oil company based in Gdańsk, Poland. The company is listed in the Polish index WIG30. The Polish state is the majority shareholder with 53% percent. The company's main activity branches are: crude oil production, refining and marketing of oil products. 
The company is a leader in lubricants on the Polish market. Grupa Lotos is a producer of unleaded gasoline, diesel, fuel oils, aviation fuels, motor and industrial lubricants, bitumens and waxes.

In 2018 the Polish oil refiner and retailer PKN Orlen announced its intent to acquire the company. The merger approval from the European Commission required significant asset divestments by both companies and is expected to reach closing in June or July 2022. On August 1, Orlen finalised the merger with Lotos.

Consolidation 
Grupa Lotos is a holding composed of Grupa Lotos S.A. - the parent undertaking which manages the refinery in Gdańsk - and 18 direct subsidiaries, including Lotos Czechowice (former Rafineria Czechowice), Lotos Jasło (former Rafineria Jasło), crude oil exploration and production company Petrobaltic. In the end of June 2006 Grupa Lotos employed 5547 people. This is 112 employees more than in the end of 2005.

Subsidiaries

 LOTOS Paliwa
 LOTOS Oil
 LOTOS Asfalt
 LOTOS Gaz w likwidacji
 LOTOS Petrobaltic
 LOTOS Exploration & Production Norge
 LOTOS Infrastruktura
 LOTOS Terminale
 LOTOS Kolej
 LOTOS Lab
 LOTOS Ochrona
 LOTOS Straż
 LOTOS Serwis
 LOTOS Geonafta
 LOTOS-Air BP Polska

Profits 
Grupa Lotos holding group consolidated net profit for the first quarter of 2006 financial year, estimated in accordance with IFRS reached approx. PLN 118 million. Grupa Lotos holding group consolidated net profit for whole 2005 financial year, estimated in accordance with IFRS reached approx. PLN 970 million. This is circa PLN 426 million more comparing to financial data from 2004.

Capacity 
Gdańsk refinery, owned by Grupa Lotos S.A., refines 6 million tons of crude oil per year. In 2005 Grupa Lotos holding group sold over 5.7 million tons of crude oil based products.

Future 
Retail Petrol Stations Network Development Programme, which launched at the end of 2004 assumes expansion of the network stations to 500 outlets. That will allow Grupa Lotos to increase its share in the retail fuel market to approx. 10% in 2012. Purchase of Esso and Slovnaft petrol stations networks in Poland (both networks hold high quality standards and possess sell volume higher than the average petrol station in Poland) indicates concrete acceleration in the process of creation a modern cross-country retail stations network.

In 2020, state-run PKN Orlen plans to take over smaller rival Lotos, if it receives approval from the European Commission. The minister also suggested Poland should have greater control over the economy.

Development 
Grupa Lotos strategy aims chiefly at: accomplishment of Gdańsk refinery investment programme (10+ Program), development of crude oil production activity and further shares growth in retail and wholesale petrol market.

References

External links 
 Grupa Lotos - Official Website of Grupa Lotos

Automotive fuel retailers
Companies based in Gdańsk
Companies listed on the Warsaw Stock Exchange
Energy companies established in 2003
Energy in Poland
Government-owned companies of Poland
Lechia Gdańsk sponsors
Oil and gas companies of Poland
Polish brands